Missing Sounds of New York is an album made by The New York Public Library, released on May 1, 2020, through advertising agency Mother New York. The album was recorded during the 2020 COVID-19 quarantine period in New York City. It includes original and archived audio to replicate the sounds of New York City prior to lockdown.

The album was launched on Spotify and SoundCloud and reception was overwhelmingly positive. As of August 2020, the album has garnered more than 350,000 streams online.

Background and recording 
During the outbreak of COVID-19 in the spring of 2020, New York City instated a "pause on nonessential services and gatherings" order, which asked its citizens to stay indoors as much as possible and practice social distancing. This caused the city to effectively shut down outside of essential services, and completely transformed the way the formerly-bustling city sounded.

Using a mix of found and newly recorded audio, the eight track album was recorded over 21 days in April 2020 to capture and revive the sounds of New York City that its residents were missing most.

It debuted on May 1, 2020, on Spotify and SoundCloud.

Critical reception 
The album was released to widespread acclaim from both local and national news and the general public. The New York Post said the album "takes our city back from the coronavirus". CoolHunting called it "strangely emotional", saying “these sounds will have any city-dweller feeling simultaneously at home and nostalgic”.

The New York Times article "It's Showtime! Press Play to Hear the N.Y.C. That Used to Be" detailed the creation of the album, they profess it "charts the sonic pulse of the city, encompassing a ballgame, a taxi ride and a visit to the library itself". The New Yorker labeled the project a "Soundtrack to a Lost New York".

American Libraries magazine called the album "a love letter to NYC, connecting city dwellers to the familiar sounds of urban life that they love and miss". Campaign US said the album "compiled bustling soundbites which make us yearn for the Big Apple". and had "irreplaceable earhole snippets of the underground rush hour, crowded parks and noisy neighbors".

Many felt the record was reminiscent of a time before the city-wide quarantine. Time Out said, "Whether or not these sounds are part of what makes you love New York, the playlist is a cozy reminder of your life before the shutdown."

In popular media 
New York-based social media star Nicolas Heller (@NewYorkNico) did a remote takeover of The New York Public Library's Instagram account on May 6, 2020, to promote the album and the library as a New York institution under COVID-19.

Trevor Noah featured the album on a segment of The Daily Show airing May 13, 2020.

Governor Andrew Cuomo featured the album as the evening's "Deep Breath Moment" in his daily COVID-19 update email on May 4, 2020.

Spotify featured "To See an Underground Show" featuring Kid the Wiz on numerous playlists.

Track listing

References 

New York Public Library
2020 albums